The Harry Potter Lexicon is a fan-created online encyclopedia of the Harry Potter series.

Overview
The site was created by school librarian Steve Vander Ark. It contains detailed information for all seven published Harry Potter books. The Lexicon lists characters, places, creatures, spells, potions and magical devices, as well as analyzing magical theory and other details of the series. The Lexicon is credited as creating one of the first timelines of all events occurring in the Harry Potter universe. A similar timeline of events was adopted by Warner Bros. for inclusion with their Harry Potter film DVDs, and was accepted by author J. K. Rowling as conforming to her works.

The Lexicon is a winner of J. K. Rowling's Fan Site Award. Rowling said:

Lawsuit

On October 31, 2007, J.K. Rowling and Warner Brothers filed a lawsuit against RDR Books over the publication of Vander Ark's Lexicon in book form. The lawsuit was heard in a New York court on April 14, 2008. Whilst some sources refer to Vander Ark being sued, the lawsuit actually names only RDR Books.

The lawsuit states: 

The result of the lawsuit was that the book could be published, but not in its present form. A modified version of the book was published in 2009.
This case went to bench trial in the New York Federal District Court of Judge Robert Patterson on April 14, 2008. RDR Books’ defense team, which includes solo San Francisco practitioner, Lizbeth Hasse of the Creative Industry Law Group, solo New York practitioner David Hammer, and the Fair Use Project at Stanford University Law School, has replied to the suit, arguing:

Rowling stated that her efforts to halt the publishing of the Lexicon have been crushing her creativity, and said that she was not sure if she has "the will or the heart" to now publish her own encyclopedia.

On 8 September 2008, Rowling won her copyright case against RDR Books. Lexicon publisher RDR Books said:

Publication
In December, 2008, a modified (and shorter) version of Vander Ark's Lexicon was approved for publication and was released January 16, 2009 as The Lexicon: An Unauthorized Guide to Harry Potter Fiction.

See also

 Harry Potter fandom

References

External links
 The Harry Potter Lexicon
 Case page on Justia.com

Harry Potter websites
Encyclopedias of fictional worlds